Henry Amuli is a Papua New Guinean politician. He represents Sohe Open in the National Parliament of Papua New Guinea.

Political career 
In April 2022, he was appointed to the Cabinet of Papua New Guinea. He became Minister of Commerce and Industry.

See also 

 Members of the National Parliament of Papua New Guinea, 2017–2022

References 

Living people
Year of birth missing (living people)
Papua New Guinean Seventh-day Adventists
21st-century Papua New Guinean politicians

Members of the National Parliament of Papua New Guinea
Government ministers of Papua New Guinea